Kanawha County Courthouse is a historic courthouse located at Charleston, West Virginia. It is located across from the Charleston City Hall, and is a block-long structure constructed in 1892 of rock-face masonry.

It is noteworthy for its picturesque massing and precise Richardsonian Romanesque design.

Additions were made to the original building in 1917 and 1924.  The twin-towered Virginia Street elevation is the glory of the Kanawha County Courthouse.  Roofs of each tower are pyramidal with chamfered corners. The belfry openings are arched and flanked with smooth grey limestone masonry colonnettes.

It was listed on the National Register of Historic Places in 1978.

References

Buildings and structures in Charleston, West Virginia
County courthouses in West Virginia
Courthouses on the National Register of Historic Places in West Virginia
Government buildings completed in 1892
H. Rus Warne buildings
National Register of Historic Places in Charleston, West Virginia
Renaissance Revival architecture in West Virginia
Richardsonian Romanesque architecture in West Virginia